Connelly Lemuelu (born 7 July 1998) is a professional rugby league footballer who plays as a  and er for the Dolphins in the NRL.

He previously played for the North Queensland Cowboys in the National Rugby League.

Background
Born and raised in Auckland, Lemuelu played rugby union for Papatoetoe before moving to Australia as a 15-year old to attend Keebra Park State High School. While at Keebra Park, he signed with the Wests Tigers.

Playing career

Early career
In 2016, Lemuelu was a member of Keebra Park's rugby league team. In the Queensland state championship game, he kicked the winning field goal in a 27–26 win over Coombabah State High School. On 14 September 2016, he started at fullback in Keebra Park's 24–26 loss to Westfields Sports High School in the GIO Schoolboy Cup final, scoring two tries.

In 2017, Lemuelu moved to Sydney, joining the Wests Tigers under-20 side. In 2019, after two seasons with the Tigers, Lemuelu joined the Canterbury Bulldogs, playing for their New South Wales Cup side. On 3 July 2019, he was elevated to the Bulldogs' NRL squad, signing a development contract. 

On 29 October 2019, he signed a two-year deal with the North Queensland Cowboys.

2020
In February, Lemuelu was a member of the Cowboys' 2020 NRL Nines winning squad. On 22 February, he started on the wing in the Cowboys 18–16 pre-season trial win over the Brisbane Broncos, scoring a try. He started the 2020 season playing for the Cowboys' Queensland Cup feeder club, the Northern Pride.

In Round 6 of the 2020 NRL season, Lemuelu made his NRL debut against the Wests Tigers. In Round 14, he scored his first NRL try in a 30–31 loss to the South Sydney Rabbitohs.

2021

2022
After missing out on initial selection, he was called up as a replacement into the Samoa squad for the 2021 Rugby League World Cup.

Achievements and accolades

Team
2020 NRL Nines: North Queensland Cowboys – Winners

Statistics

NRL
 Statistics are correct to the end of the 2022 season

References

External links

North Queensland Cowboys profile

1998 births
New Zealand rugby league players
North Queensland Cowboys players
Dolphins (NRL) players
Rugby league centres
Northern Pride RLFC players
Rugby league wingers
Rugby league players from Auckland
Rugby league second-rows
People from Auckland
Living people